Fencing events were contested at the 1983 Summer Universiade in Edmonton, Alberta, Canada.

Medal overview

Men's events

Women's events

Medal table

References
 Universiade fencing medalists on HickokSports

1983 Summer Universiade
Universiade
Fencing at the Summer Universiade
International fencing competitions hosted by Canada